The list of ship commissionings in 1890 includes a chronological list of all ships commissioned in 1890.


See also 

1890
 Ship commissionings